Norton is a village in Powys within the historic boundaries of Radnorshire, Wales. In 1086, Norton was recorded as a settlement within the hundred of Leintwardine and in the county of Shropshire in the Domesday Book.

References

Villages in Powys
Presteigne